Medinella is a genus of tachinid flies in the family Tachinidae.

Distribution
New Zealand.

Species
M. albifrons Malloch, 1938
M. flavofemorata Malloch, 1938
M. nigrifemorata Malloch, 1938
M. varipes Malloch, 1938

References

Tachininae
Diptera of Australasia